McCulloch is a surname.

McCulloch may also refer to:

Places
McCulloch County, Texas

Ships
USRC McCulloch, name of more than one cutter of the United States Revenue Cutter Service
USCGC McCulloch, name of more than one cutter of the United States Coast Guard
USS McCulloch, cutter in commission in the United States Navy in 1917

Other uses
McCulloch Motors Corporation, chainsaw and power tool manufacturer
McCulloch Aircraft Corporation
McCulloch v. Maryland, U.S. Supreme Court ruling

See also 
MacCulloch
McCullagh
McCullough (disambiguation)
McAuliffe (disambiguation) (including MacAuliffe)